In chemistry, a selenosulfide refers to distinct classes of inorganic and organic compounds containing sulfur and selenium.  The organic derivatives contain Se-S bonds, whereas the inorganic derivatives are more variable.

Organic selenosulfides
These species are classified as both organosulfur and organoselenium compounds.  They are hybrids of organic disulfides and organic diselenides.

Preparation, structure, and reactivity
Selenosulfides have been prepared by the reaction of selenyl halides with thiols:

The equilibrium between diselenides and disulfides lies on the left:
RSeSeR  +  R'SSR'   2 RSeSR'
Because of the facility of this equilibrium, many of the best characterized examples of selenosulfides are cyclic, whereby S-Se bonds are stabilized intramolecularly.  One example is the 1,8-selenosulfide of naphthalene. The selenium-sulfur bond length is about 220 picometers, the average of a typical S-S and Se-Se bond.

Occurrence
Selenosulfide groups can be found in almost all living organisms as part of various peroxidase enzymes, such as glutathione peroxidase and thioredoxin reductase. They are formed by the oxidative coupling of  selenocysteine and cysteine residues. This reaction is powered by the decomposition of cellular peroxides, which can be highly damaging and a source of oxidative stress. Selenocysteine has a lower reduction potential than cysteine, making it very suitable for proteins that are involved in antioxidant activity.

Selenosulfides have been identified in some species of Allium and in roasted coffee.  The mammalian version of the protein thioredoxin reductase contains a selenocysteine residue which forms a thioselenide (analogous to a disulfide) upon oxidation.

Inorganic selenosulfides

Some inorganic selenide sulfide compounds are also known.  Simplest is the material selenium sulfide, which has medicinal properties. It adopt the diverse structures of elemental sulfur but with some S atoms replaced by Se.

Other inorganic selenide sulfide compounds occur as minerals and as pigments.  One example is antimony selenosulfide.

The pigment cadmium red consists of cadmium sulfoselenide.  It is a solid solution of cadmium sulfide, which is yellow, and cadmium selenide, which is dark brown. It is used as an artist's pigment.  Unlike the organic selenosulfides and unlike selenide sulfide itself, no S-Se bond exists in CdS1−xSex or in Sb2S3−xSex.

References

Organoselenium compounds
Organosulfur compounds
 
Cadmium compounds
Selenides
Semiconductor materials
Optical materials
Mixed anion compounds
Sulfides